Pokémon Quest is a free-to-play action-adventure game in the Pokémon series developed by Game Freak and published by Nintendo and The Pokémon Company. It was released for the Nintendo Switch in May 2018 and for Android and iOS in June 2018. Within a week of its release, it had reached over 7.5million downloads.

Gameplay
Pokémon Quest features a blocky, voxel-style design similar to Minecraft. The game is set in Tumblecube Island, featuring cube-shaped Pokémon called "Pokéxel". The Pokémon featured in the game are from the original lineup from the Kanto region in Pokémon Red and Blue. In the game, players control the base camp and the Pokémon team. The player's main task is to complete all the levels on the island, beating the wild Pokémon. The game process can be divided into four parts: base camp management, going on expeditions, training and optimising Pokémon, and attracting new Pokémon.

Base camp management
The base camp helps the player progress in the game. In the camp you are able to prepare dishes to attract new Pokémon, set up decorations for various effects, and receive new Pokémon that visit the campsite once every 22 hours. There is also a Poké Mart that allow the player to purchase DLC Packs, Decorations and Box Expansions. Players can also claim 50 PM Tickets (game's currency) every 22 hours, where the amount a player receives can increase with the purchase of DLC Packs. PM Tickets are used to purchase Decorations and Box Expansions, as well as instantly completing a dish and recharging the energy for Expeditions.

Expeditions
The player's team needs to clear the island from wild Pokémon. To do this, players need to go through 12 locations, each with 3 to 7 levels. For each level players can bring up to three Pokémon with them. Pokémon can not only attack but also use special attacking or defensive moves. In total, the game has 167 unique movesets distributed in such a way that each Pokémon has from 2 to 11 special moves. After using a special move the Pokémon needs to wait a few seconds (depending on the move used) to restore it. During this time it can only use normal attacks. Each level's completion opens access to the next level in the location.

Getting new Pokémon
Players can attract new Pokémon by preparing food. For this, there is a cooking pot in the base camp. Depending on the ingredients, one of the 18 possible dishes will be cooked. Different dishes call on Pokémon of different types. Ingredients are obtained primarily from expeditions, but it can also be obtained from recycling unused Power Stones. Ingredients are classified by their colour, hardness, type and rarity. Rarer Pokémon are attracted to dishes that use rare ingredients. The cooking pot used determines the bonus stats and the level of Pokémon that it attracts, where the better the pot used the more ingredients it has to use to cook.

Pokémon training and optimization
Pokémon can level up by going on expeditions, or through training. Training a Pokémon uses other Pokémon to gain experience and once the training is done, the support Pokémon will leave. A player can also train their Pokémon to replace the Pokémon's current moveset, using other Pokémon as support Pokémon. If the player uses the same species or the same type of Pokémon as the support Pokémon, the amount of experience gained and the chances of changing a move is increased compared to using random Pokémon as support Pokémon. Although, the experience gained and the chances of changing the moveset decreases after every training done on the Pokémon.

Each Pokémon have their own Power Charms, where special stones called "Power Stones" can be inserted to increase the Pokémon's stats. Mighty Stones increase attack and Sturdy Stones increase the HP. The stones can be put into the Pokémon's Power Stone slots. These stones may also contain special effects that improves various stats such as Movement Speed or Critical Hit Rate. Other than the Mighty Stones and Sturdy Stones, special kinds of rare stones can be put onto the slots next to the move of the Pokémon. These stones can give the moves further advantages towards their use. It is also noted that certain moves can equip certain types of special stones.

Release 
Pokémon Quest was announced during a press conference held by The Pokémon Company on May 30, 2018, and released on the eShop as a free-to-start title for the Nintendo Switch later that same day. It was also announced that a mobile version will be released for iOS and Android devices in late June 2018. Pokémon Quest was released on Android and iOS on June 27, 2018.

At the game's launch, three downloadable content packs were released for purchase, along with items available for individual purchase. The packs contain items and bonuses that can be used to enhance gameplay.

Reception 

Glen Fox of Nintendo Life noted that the game was "casual" and "simple to pick up", but criticized the energy system, although noting that it was far from a "money sink". Brian Shea from Game Informer noticed some bugs and passive gameplay and gave the game a mixed review, saying that "I enjoy parts of Pokémon Quest, but the adventure never amounts to anything memorable."

Within two days of its release, the game had received over one million downloads. After one week, the game reached more than 7.5million downloads worldwide, with first-week revenue exceeding $3million on iOS and Android. During its first month on iOS and Android, the game received nearly 8million downloads and grossed  on the mobile platforms. By the end of 2018, the game had crossed 10million mobile downloads.

References

External links 

2018 video games
Android (operating system) games
Free-to-play video games
iOS games
Nintendo Switch games
Video games developed in Japan
Video games set on fictional islands
Action-adventure games
Single-player video games
Quest
Game Freak games